Yağmur Şengül (born 8 January 1994) is a Turkish Paralympian archer competing in the Women's recurve bow W2 event.

Şengül took part at the 2018 European Para-Archery Championships in Plzeň, Czech Republic, and placed fourth losing the bronze medal match. She won the gold medal in the Individual recurve event at the 7th Fazza Para Archery World Ranking Tournament in Dubai, United Arab Emirates in 2021.

She is competing at the 2020 Summer Paralympics in the Individual recurve open and Mixed team recurve events.

References

1994 births
Living people
Turkish female archers
Paralympic archers of Turkey
Wheelchair category Paralympic competitors
Archers at the 2020 Summer Paralympics
21st-century Turkish sportswomen
Islamic Solidarity Games medalists in archery